Sakuda Dam is a rockfill dam located in Aomori Prefecture in Japan. The dam is used for flood control. The catchment area of the dam is 11 km2. The dam impounds about 15  ha of land when full and can store 1282 thousand cubic meters of water. The construction of the dam was started on 1969 and completed in 1979.

References

Dams in Aomori Prefecture
1979 establishments in Japan